BE is the second and final studio album by English rock band Beady Eye, released on . It was recorded between November 2012 and March 2013. The album was produced by Dave Sitek who has previously produced records for Yeah Yeah Yeahs, TV on the Radio and Jane's Addiction. BE debuted at number two on the UK Albums Chart behind Black Sabbath's 13. Despite receiving mixed reviews from contemporary critics, BE is considered by many fans to be an improvement from their debut album, Different Gear, Still Speeding and is notable for showcasing a rare experimental approach which departs from the sound of previous Beady Eye and Oasis albums.

Release and promotion
Gallagher wanted the album to be titled Universal Gleam, but was outvoted by the rest of the band and label.<ref name="UG">{{Cite web|url=https://www.nme.com/news/music/beady-eye-76-1265823|title = Liam Gallagher: 'I didn't want to call new Beady Eye album 'BE|website = NME|date = May 2013}}</ref> Universal Gleam was later used for the title of a track on Gallagher's debut solo album As You Were.

The first song released from the album was "Flick of the Finger", which music video was premiered at Beady Eye's official website. The song peaked at number 138 in the UK, however, the song was not the first single from the album. The first official single from the album was "Second Bite of the Apple".Beady Eye debut "Second Bite if the Apple" video Gigwise.com It was due to receive its first UK Radio airplay on Zane Lowe BBC Radio 1 programme on 15 April 2013, but Zane Lowe then announced it has been rescheduled to 29 April. "Second Bite of the Apple" charted at number 112 in the UK. It was also performed live on BBC talent show The Voice UK semi-final on Saturday 15 June 2013. The double A-side "Shine a Light" / "The World's Not Set in Stone" was released on 19 August. Their new double A-side "Iz Rite" / "Soul Love" was released on 25 November.

The album (and subsequent single) artwork was designed by Trevor Jackson and features photographs by Harry Peccinotti, originally shot for NOVA Magazine. The band used a largely Internet-based promotional tactic that required people to share the Beady Eye website to unlock different stems of the song "Flick of the Finger". The album leaked online in its entirety 2 weeks before its official release on 10 June. The album was released in standard and deluxe editions. Deluxe edition features four extra tracks, while Japanese deluxe edition featured additional two tracks.

ReceptionBE received a mixed critical reception. The album has a score of 59 on Metacritic, indicating "mixed or average reviews". Many positive reviews complemented the band's progression from their debut album whilst negative reviews criticised the album's lyrics and production.

Simon Harper of Clash magazine said, "Shades of light and dark ripple throughout and keep the listener guessing... (On 'Soul Love') Liam Gallagher's cosmic vibe is matched by the first distinct stamp of producer David Sitek's ambient adventuring, which commandeers the second-half of the song, letting it drift dreamily skywards. This is what permeates BE, making it sonically enchanting." In a 4/5 review from Daily Express, they said, "'Second Bite of the Apple' is a complex, soulful shuffle, arguably the most Lennon-esque piece Gallagher has recorded, 'Soon Come Tomorrow' a truly great pop tune with phased guitar and 'I'm Just Saying' an exercise in sheer exuberance with a counted-off refrain that will be echoing around a stadium near you soon." NME gave BE a 8/10 review and remarked that "BE is certainly an improvement on Different Gear, Still Speeding, but it's more of a tentative step in the right direction than a great leap forward."

In a mixed review, Pitchfork criticised David Sitek's production that, "This is a band that needs to sound a little blurry and blown-out; Beady Eye’s broad strokes and bombastic flourishes are more satisfying when you can’t make out the specifics. Sitek’s pristine production only highlights how half-baked many of these songs are, especially lyrically." PopMatters gave BE'' a score of 6/10 saying, "When Liam suggested those with a penchant for drugs would enjoy BE one suspects he might’ve meant psychiatric drugs. Gallagher may’ve long since disowned Beady Eye’s so-so début as "Fucking stupid" but at least it was fun. BE is too often clunky n' hollow and surprisingly downbeat n' dog-tired. Getting Dr. Sitek on board should’ve been a masterstroke but they’ve seemingly misread "Psychedelic n' experimental!” as "Add a flute!” Liam Gallagher can be a charismatic, mesmerising presence, but he’s in danger of becoming the fool on the hill. If only he knew someone who could write him a decent tune."

Track listing

Bonus tracks

Credits

Beady Eye
 Liam Gallagher – lead vocals, tambourine, additional rhythm guitar
 Gem Archer – lead guitar, keyboards, backing vocals
 Andy Bell – rhythm guitar, keyboards, backing vocals
 Chris Sharrock – drums, percussion
 Jeff Wootton – bass guitar

Production
 Dave Sitek – production

Charts

Weekly charts

Year-end charts

Certifications

References

External links

BE at YouTube (streamed copy where licensed)

2013 albums
Beady Eye albums
Columbia Records albums
Albums produced by Dave Sitek